Bald Knob is a summit located in Franklin County, Virginia. The summit has an elevation of 1400 feet and is a familiar landmark overlooking the county seat, Rocky Mount.

References 

Geography of Franklin County, Virginia